Early in the Morning is an album by American jazz vocalist Lorez Alexandria featuring performances recorded in 1960 and released on the Argo label.

Critical reception

AllMusic reviewer Thom Jurek stated "Ultimately, Early in the Morning is the most sophisticated kind of blues recording. The musical arrangements are both groove-laden and wonderfully impressionistic, allowing Alexandria's unusual delivery line plenty of space to play".

Track listing
 "Early in the Morning" (Louis Jordan, Dallas Bartley, Leo Hickman) – 2:58
 "Don't Explain" (Billie Holiday, Arthur Herzog Jr.) – 3:13
 "So Long" (Remus Harris, Russ Morgan, Irving Melsher) – 3:28
 "Good Morning Heartache" (Irene Higginbotham, Ervin Drake, Dan Fisher) – 3:19
 "Trouble Is a Man" (Alec Wilder) – 2:44
 "I Ain't Got Nothin' but the Blues (Duke Ellington, Don George) – 2:22
 "Baby Don't You Cry" (Buddy Johnson) – 2:15
 "Rocks in My Bed" (Ellington) – 2:42
 "I'm Just a Lucky So-and-So" (Ellington, Mack David) – 3:02
 "I Almost Lost My Mind" (Ivory Joe Hunter) – 3:03

Personnel
Lorez Alexandria – vocals
Tracks 1–10:
Ramsey Lewis – piano 
Eldee Young – bass
Red Holt – drums
Johnny Gray – guitar
Tracks 6–10:
Frank Foster – tenor saxophone, arranger
Joe Newman – trumpet
Al Grey – trombone
Frank Wess – flute, tenor saxophone
Freddie Green – rhythm guitar
Kirk Stuart – arranger (tracks 1–5)

References 

Argo Records albums
Lorez Alexandria albums
Ramsey Lewis albums
1960 albums